Stromboli is a type of baked turnover filled with various Italian cheeses (typically mozzarella) and usually Italian cold cuts (typically Italian meats such as salami, capocollo and bresaola) or vegetables served hot. The dough used is either Italian bread dough or pizza dough. Stromboli was invented by Italian-Americans in the United States in the Philadelphia area. The name of the dish is taken from a volcanic island off the coast of Sicily.

A stromboli is similar to a calzone or scaccia, and the dishes are sometimes confused. Unlike calzones, which are always stuffed and folded into a crescent shape, a stromboli is typically rolled or folded into a cylinder, and may sometimes contain a thin layer of tomato sauce on the inside.

Preparation
Many American pizza shops serve a stromboli using pizza dough that is folded in half with fillings, similar to a half-moon-shaped calzone. At other establishments, a stromboli is made with a square-shaped pizza dough that can be topped with any pizza toppings and is then rolled into a cylindrical jelly roll shape and baked. Other variations include adding pizza sauce or deep-frying, in a similar manner as a panzerotti.

Origins
There are several claims regarding the origin of the usage of the name stromboli for food in the United States.

Romano's Italian Restaurant & Pizzeria claims to have first used the name in 1950 in Essington, Pennsylvania, just outside Philadelphia, courtesy of Nazzareno Romano, an Italian immigrant. The pizzeria owner had experimented with pizza imbottita, or "stuffed pizza", and added ham, cotechino sausage, cheese and peppers into a pocket of bread dough. His future brother-in-law suggested he name it after the recently released movie Stromboli, notorious for an off-screen affair between married actress, Ingrid Bergman, and married director, Roberto Rossellini, resulting in a love child.

In 1954, Mike Aquino of Mike's Burger Royal in Spokane, Washington, says he also named a turnover after the same movie. However, Aquino's version appears to only share the same name as the commonly accepted version of the stromboli and is significantly different from the Philadelphia turnover version that is usually defined as a "stromboli". Aquino's "stromboli" consists of capicola ham and provolone cheese covered in an Italian chili sauce on a French bread roll. Variations also exist in Indiana.

See also
 
 Calzone
 Scaccia
 List of regional dishes of the United States
 List of stuffed dishes
 Pepperoni roll
 Sausage bread
 Italian-Americans in Philadelphia
 Hot Pockets

References

Further reading
 Mariani, John (1999). The Encyclopedia of American Food and Drink. New York: Lebhar-Friedman Books. . .
 Romano, Pete. Nazzareno Romano's Grandson

External links 

Cuisine of Philadelphia
Italian-American culture in Philadelphia
Pizza styles
Roberto Rossellini
Sicilian-American cuisine
Stuffed dishes
Brands